The European Assisted Conception Consortium (EACC) is an organization whose aim is to bring together national ART regulators and practitioners within the European Union for professional cooperation and joint action.

Its inaugural meeting was in Copenhagen in 2005, under the chairmanship of Angela McNab.

See also
European Society of Human Reproduction and Embryology

References

European Assisted Conception Consortium (EACC)

Biology in Europe
Conception
Embryology
Pan-European scientific societies